The 2009 Torneo Clasura, officially the Campeonato Nacional de Clausura Copa BancoEstado 2009, was the 86th top tier tournament. It began on July 12 and is scheduled to end on December 16. Colo-Colo were the champions, winning its 29th title.

Classification Stage

Standings

Results

Playoff stage

Colo-Colo qualified to the 2010 Copa Libertadores Second Stage.

Top goalscorers

Updated as of games played on December 9, 2009.Source:

Relegation
Relegation for this season will be determined by an aggregate table of the Classification Stages of both the Apertura and Clausura tournaments. The teams that finish 17th and 18th will be automatically relegated to the Primera B for the next season. The teams that finish 15th and 16th will play a relegation/promotion playoff against two teams from the 2009 Primera B season.

Relegation/promotion playoff
By finishing 15th in the relegation table, Palestino was pitted against the San Marcos de Arica, the 2nd best team in the 2009 Primera B General Table. Curicó Unido, by finishing 16th in the relegation table, played against San Luis, the loser of the 2009 Primera B championship playoff. The team who obtains the most point after two legs will stay or be promoted to the Primera División. Should there be a tie on points, it will be settled as follows: 1) overall goal difference; 2) most away goal; 3) extra time of two 15-minute halves; 4) penalty shootout according to the Laws of the Game. The Primera División (Team #1) played the second leg at home.

See also 
2009 in Chilean football
2009 Copa Chile

References

External links
ANFP 
Season regulations 
2009 season on RSSSF

Primera División de Chile seasons
Chile
Prim